Gentleman with a Briefcase (Swedish: Herre med portfölj) is a 1943 Swedish drama film directed by Ragnar Arvedson and starring Georg Rydeberg, Irma Christenson and Anne-Margrethe Björlin. It was shot at the Centrumateljéerna Studios in Stockholm. The film's sets were designed by the art director Bertil Duroj.

Synopsis
Rolf Berger, a respected judge who has been married to Eva for a number of years encounters the much younger Inger and falls in love with her.

Cast
 Georg Rydeberg as 	Rolf Berger
 Irma Christenson as 	Eva
 Anne-Margrethe Björlin as 	Inger Alinder
 Stig Järrel as 	Manager Bexell
 Alf Kjellin as 	Lennart Dalén
 Åke Claesson as 	Recording Clerk
 Hugo Björne as 	Master of Court Appeal
 Bengt Ekerot as Stig
 Olav Riégo as 	Justice of Appeal
 Ragnar Widestedt as 	Doctor
 Anders Nyström as 	Gunnar, Berger's Son
 Alicia Lignell as 	Gerd, Berger's Daughter
 Olof Widgren as 	Alvar Quarnström
 Sven Bergvall as Master of Court Appeal
 Julie Bernby as Shop Assistant 
 Eivor Engelbrektsson as 	Shop Assistant
 Artur Cederborgh as 	Conductor
 Georg Fernqvist as 	Porter 
 Inga-Lill Åhström as 	Aina 
 Karl Erik Flens as 	Lennart's Friend 
 Jullan Kindahl as 	Boarding house hostess
 Sven Lindberg as 	Assessor
 Nina Scenna as 	Nurse 
 Anna-Stina Wåglund as 	Nurse 
 Åke Uppström as 	Waiter

References

Bibliography 
 Qvist, Per Olov & von Bagh, Peter. Guide to the Cinema of Sweden and Finland. Greenwood Publishing Group, 2000.

External links 
 

1943 films
Swedish drama films
1943 drama films
1940s Swedish-language films
Films directed by Ragnar Arvedson
Swedish black-and-white films
1940s Swedish films